South Lodge Pit is a  geological Site of Special Scientific Interest in Taplow in Buckinghamshire. It is a Geological Conservation Review site.

This former chalk quarry dates to the late Cretaceous, around 83 million year ago. It is the only British example of a chalk phosphorite deposit, comparable to deposits in the Paris Basin. In the late Cretaceous sea levels were much higher and covered much of England, including Buckinghamshire. Marine fossils are found in several horizons, including annelids, oysters and bivalves.

The site is on private land with no public access.

References

External links
Geological Conservation Review: Volume 23: British Upper Cretaceous Stratigraphy, Chapter 4: Transitional Province, England, Site: SOUTH LODGE PIT (GCR ID: 194)

Sites of Special Scientific Interest in Buckinghamshire
Geological Conservation Review sites